Kandhar is a town and a municipal council in Nanded district in the Indian state of Maharashtra. It lies near the western shore of Manyad Reservoir. Kandhar was famous as a major Jain centre in the Rashtrakuta kingdom, having Malkhed or Manyakheta as his capital. A huge statue of Kshetrapala (deity related to Jains) is found near the bhuikot; the statue is broken but from the toenail that survives, its height is estimated to be more than 50 feet. Presently, there is an old Digambar Jain Temple in Kandhar which is awaiting for its renovation. Kandhar is also famous for Kandhar Fort.

History
In 1649, Shah Jahan aimed to recapture Kandhar and sent Aurangzeb with 60,000 cavalry and 10,000 infantry. The resultant Siege of Kandhar lasted for three months and 20 days.

Demographics
 India census, Kandhar had a population of 24,843. Males constitute 53% of the population and females 47%. Kandhar has an average literacy rate of 78%, higher than the national average of 75%: male literacy is 73%, and female literacy is 56%. In Kandhar, 15% of the population is under 6 years of age.
It is also famous for the fort named Bhuikot, which is situated in Bahadarpura 3 km away from Kandhar. Kandhar is a historical city. Kandhar is also famous for custard apples.

See also

 Kandhar Fort

References

Cities and towns in Nanded district
Talukas in Maharashtra